Onwumere is a surname. Notable people with the surname include: 

Ngozi Onwumere (born 1992), American–Nigerian sprinter and bobsledder
Toby Onwumere (born 1990), Nigerian-born American actor

Surnames of Nigerian origin